The 1980 Livermore earthquake occurred on January 24 at 11:00 PST in California. The earthqake had a maximum Modified Mercalli intensity of VII (Very strong). Forty four people were injured and damage across the San Francisco Bay Area totaled $11.5 million, with the majority inflicted at the Lawrence Livermore Laboratory.

Earthquake
The mainshock was preceded by a 2.7  foreshock 1.5 minutes prior. In the first six says after the mainshock, 59 aftershocks were recorded measuring ≥ 2.5 . Six hundred aftershocks were recorded in the 33 days after the mainshock. An analysis of P wave indicate the fault plane solution was right-lateral strike-slip faulting.

Faulting
Surface faulting consisting of discontinued and small offsets occurred along the Greenville and Las Positas faults. Surface faulting was sparce along the rupture. Offset was also recorded along at least  of the Las Positas Fault Zone. These consisted of small left-lateral offsets.

Damage
Damage to property was nonstructural—consisting of fallen ceiling tiles, detached bricks from chimneys, ruptured gas and water lines, shattered windows, and mobile homes displaced from their foundations. At a ranch north of Livermore, along Vasco Road, two brick-and-stone fireplaces were fractured and offset from their walls. Along Interstate 580 and Greenville Road, a concrete pavement sunk , and the a concrete abutment fractured and spalled. Forty four people were injured. Damage at the Lawrence Livermore Laboratory was estimated at $10 million.

The January 26 aftershock caused six additional injuries in Livermore from glass and falling debris. Fifty homes sustained minor damage in Tassajara. A fireplace was damaged, walls and concrete fractured, walls detached from ceilings, windows broke and a chimney collapsed. In Danville, a brick chimney and fireplace were damaged, stone wall was destroyed, and walls, patios, sidewalks and ceilings cracked. Several other towns reported slight damage.

See also
List of earthquakes in 1980
List of earthquakes in California

References

1980 earthquakes
Earthquakes in California
1980 in California
History of the San Francisco Bay Area
January 1980 events in the United States